are sweet deep fried buns of dough similar to doughnuts (or the Portuguese malasada, or the Dutch oliebollen), native to Southern China, there named sa-yung (沙翁, Yale Romanization: sa1yung1, PinYin: shā wēng), then spread to the Japanese prefecture of Okinawa. They are also popular in Hawaii, sometimes known there simply as andagi. Sata andagi is made by mixing flour, sugar and eggs.  The ingredients are mixed into a ball and deep fried.

In its Okinawan name, Saataa means "sugar",  while andaagii means "deep fried" ("oil" (anda) + "fried" (agii)) in Okinawan (satō and abura-age in Japanese.) It is also known as saataa andagii and saataa anragii.

Sata andagi are a part of Okinawan cuisine. Like most confectionery from the Ryukyu Islands, the techniques for making them are descended from a combination of Chinese and Japanese techniques. They are typically prepared so that the outside is crispy and browned while the inside is light and cake-like.

See also
 List of doughnut varieties
 List of fried dough varieties

References

External links

A simple sata andagi recipe

Doughnuts
Chinese desserts
Chinese cuisine